

Poocher Swamp Game Reserve is a protected area in the Australian state of South Australia located about  south-east of the state capital of Adelaide and about  west of the municipal seat of Bordertown in the locality of Cannawigara.  

The game reserve consists of sections 12, 661 and 662 in the cadastral unit of the Hundred of Wirrega. It was proclaimed under the National Parks and Wildlife Act 1972 on 14 November 1985 in respect to sections 12 and 661 to provide “opportunities for hunting and other recreational activities.”  On 16 March 1989, land in section 662 of the Hundred of Wirrega was added to the game reserve.

The game reserve is classified as an IUCN Category VI protected area.

See also
Duck hunting in South Australia 
Protected areas of South Australia

References

External links
Poocher Swamp Game Reserve webpage on the Protected Planet website
Poocher Swamp Game Reserve webpage on the BirdsSA website

Game reserves of South Australia
Protected areas established in 1985
1985 establishments in Australia
Limestone Coast